Ralph Stafford may refer to:

 Ralph de Stafford, 1st Earl of Stafford
 Ralph Stafford (knight), eldest son of the 2nd earl of Stafford
 Ralph Stafford (MP), MP for [Staffordshire, 1404 and Worcestershire, 1383, 1401